Overmind  may refer to:

In science fiction
 Overmind, an interstellar hive mind that dominates the Milky Way Galaxy in the novel Childhood's End by Arthur C. Clarke
 Zerg Overmind, one of the antagonists in the StarCraft series
 Overmind (comics), a supervillain in the world of Marvel Comics
 Overmind, a group of three powerful aliens in the Sonic Chronicles: The Dark Brotherhood video game
 Overmind, a villainous artificial intelligence in the GURPS Reign of Steel roleplaying setting

In transpersonal psychology
 Overmind, a concept in Sri Aurobindo's Integral psychology
 Overmind, the highest level of consciousness in the eight-circuit model of consciousness

See also 
 Group mind (science fiction)